The Best Game ESPY Award is an annual award honoring the achievements of a team who has performed the best play in the world of sports. It was first awarded as part of the ESPY Awards in 2002. The Best Game ESPY Award trophy, designed by sculptor Lawrence Nowlan, is awarded to the team on the single regular season or playoff game contested professionally under the auspices of one of the four major North American leagues or collegiately under the auspices of the National Collegiate Athletic Association adjudged, in view of its quality, competitiveness, excitement, and significance, to be the best. Since 2004, the winner has been chosen by online voting through choices selected by the ESPN Select Nominating Committee. Before that, determination of the winners was made by an panel of experts. Through the 2001 iteration of the ESPY Awards, ceremonies were conducted in February of each year to honor achievements over the previous calendar year; awards presented thereafter are conferred in July and reflect performance from the June previous.

The inaugural winner of the Best Game ESPY Award in 2002 was the seventh game of the 2001 World Series which decided that year's baseball title in favour of the expansion team Arizona Diamondbacks over the New York Yankees. The following year's recipient of the accolade went to Ohio State University Buckeyes in their 2003 Fiesta Bowl victory over the University of Miami Hurricanes. College football games have won the award three times and earned another two nominations after American football which has the most wins of any other sport with eight awards and six nominations while basketball and ice hockey games each have one victory each. The 2018 winner of the Best Game ESPY Award is the 2018 Winter Olympics women's ice hockey gold medal game in which the United States team won against Canada's squad in a 3–2 shootout victory to claim their first gold medal in women's ice hockey since the 1998 Winter Games. The award wasn't awarded in 2020 due to the COVID-19 pandemic.

Winners and nominees

See also
 Best Upset ESPY Award
 Outstanding Team ESPY Award

Notes and references

Notes

References

External links
 

ESPY Awards